Woyanqudi, born Tuqitang (屠耆堂), was a Chanyu of the Xiongnu Empire. The successor to Xulüquanqu Chanyu, he reigned from 60 to 58 BC.

Woyanqudi was a tyrannical ruler. He killed his predecessor's supporters and dismissed his own kinsfolk. He killed himself in 58 BC and the Xiongnu split into several warring factions. By 55 BC, the two dominant factions were his sons: Huhanye Chanyu and Zhizhi Chanyu.

Footnotes

References
Bichurin N.Ya., "Collection of information on peoples in Central Asia in ancient times", vol. 1, Sankt Petersburg, 1851, reprint Moscow-Leningrad, 1950

Taskin B.S., "Materials on Sünnu history", Science, Moscow, 1968, p. 31 (In Russian)

Chanyus
1st-century BC rulers in Asia
58 BC deaths